The Chile women's national 3x3 basketball team is the basketball side that represents Chile in international 3x3 basketball (3 against 3) competitions. It is organized and run by the Federación de Básquetbol de Chile.

World Cup record

References

External links
Official website

3
Women's national 3x3 basketball teams